= Vladas Byla =

Lithuanian footballer

Personal information
- Position: Forward

International career
| Years | Team | Apps | (Gls) |
| 1924 | Lithuania | 2 | (0) |

Vladas Byla was a Lithuanian footballer. He played in two matches for the Lithuania national football team in 1924. He was also part of Lithuania's squad for the football tournament at the 1924 Summer Olympics, but he did not play in any matches.
